Chatra Shah also Chhatra Shah, Ksatra Shah (c. 1605–1606) was briefly the king of the Gorkha Kingdom in the Indian subcontinent, present-day Nepal. After the death of his father Purna Shah. He was the brother of Rama Shah.

References

Gurkhas
1606 deaths
Year of birth uncertain
People from Gorkha District
17th-century Nepalese people
Nepalese Hindus